Eisgenossen is a nickname that may refer to:

Switzerland women's national ice hockey team
Switzerland men's national ice hockey team